The Dorji family (Dzongkha: རྡོ་རྗེ་; Wylie: Rdo-rje) of Bhutan has been a prominent and powerful political family in the kingdom since the 12th century AD. The family has produced monarchs, Prime Minister of Bhutan, Prime Ministers, Dzong lords and governors. The fourth king of Bhutan Druk Gyalpo, Jigme Singye Wangchuck, as well as his son the current fifth king of Bhutan Jigme Khesar Namgyel Wangchuck, are also members of the Dorji family and therefore also descendants of the royal family of Sikkim. The Dorji family is also the holder of the Bhutan House estate in Kalimpong, India.

History
The powerful aristocratic Dorji family are descended from the influential 12th-century aristocratic Lama Sum-phrang Chos-rje (b.1179; d. 1265). The Dorji family are therefore also descended from the aristocratic Dungkar Choji (b. 1578) of the prominent Nyö clan. This means that the Dorji family are related by blood to the reigning Wangchuck monarchs who share the same ancestors. In fact Gongzim Ugyen Dorji (b.1855; d.1916) who served as the Chamberlain (Gongzim) to the first king Ugyen Wangchuck was also his second cousin, because they shared the same great-grandfather Padma, son of the aristocratic Rabgyas.

From the beginning of Bhutan's hereditary monarchy, members of the family served as gongzim (Chamberlain, the top government post), and their official residence was at the palatial Bhutan House at Kalimpong.

Gongzim Ugyen Dorji as a befitting a person born as an aristocrat, was groomed for diplomacy and politics from a very early age by his father Shap Penchung who was a very influential member of the court, as well as being the Dzongpon (Dzong Lord) of Jungtsa. As a young lad, Gongzim Ugen Dorji acted as a moderator between the British diplomatic officials and the Bhutanese court. And in 1864 he accompanied his father to meet the British diplomatic mission under Sir Ashley Eden. At this time, Sir Ashley Eden and his entourage were incarcerated and threatened with execution by the Bhutanese government officials, but Gongzim Ugyen Dorji's father Shatpa Puenchung was instrumental in saving their lives and setting them free. This diplomatic crisis resulted in the Duar wars between the Bhutanese and the British Empire. As an adult, Gongzim Ugen Dorji became Chief Minister to his second cousin Penlop (Lord) Ugyen Wangchuck and was instrumental in uniting the various fiefdoms of Bhutan to create a hereditary monarchy with Ugyen Wangchuck as the first reigning Dragon King. The role of Chamberlain became hereditary within the Dorji family and Gongzim Ugyen Dorji was succeeded in this position by his son Sonam Topgay Dorji. In turn, Sonam Topgay Dorji's eldest son Jigme Palden Dorji was appointed Chief Minister to his kinsman King Jigme Dorji Wangchuck in 1952. In 1958, he became the first man to hold the title Prime Minister of Bhutan (Lyonchen), when the position of Chief Minister was upgraded in 1958, as part of a wider series of reforms by King Jigme Dorji Wangchuck.

From Bhutan House, Gongzim Ugyen Dorji's son Raja Sonam Topgay Dorji ("Topgay Raja") held the post of Trade Agent to the Government of Bhutan, however he functioned to a large extent as prime minister, foreign minister, and ambassador to India. Through this position as a trade intermediary, the Dorji family amassed wealth reputedly greater than that of the royal family. Topgay Raja himself married a Sikkimese princess, Rani Mayum Choying Wangmo Dorji.

In 1904, Trongsa Penlop Ugyen Wangchuck, firmly in power and advised by Gongzim Ugyen Dorji of the Dorji family, accompanied the British expedition to Tibet as an invaluable intermediary, earning the Penlop his first British knighthood. The same year, a power vacuum formed within the already dysfunctional Bhutanese dual system of government. Civil administration had fallen to the hands of  Wangchuck, and in November 1907 he was unanimously elected hereditary monarch by an assembly of the leading members of the clergy, officials, and aristocratic families. His ascendency to the throne ended the traditional in place for nearly 300 years and the beginning of the Royal House of Wangchuck.

After two generations as Gongzim to the Wangchuck dynasty, Kesang Choden, the sister of Prime Minister Jigme Palden Dorji – the daughter of Topgay Raja and Princess Rani Mayum Choyin Wangmo of Sikkim – married the Third King, creating a new bond so prominent as to cause discontent among other Bhutanese families.  The public was divided between pro-modernist and pro-monarchist camps.

Assassination of Jigme Dorji
In the early 1960s, the Third King fell ill and went to Switzerland for treatment. Dorji conflicted with the Royal Bhutan Army over the use of military vehicles, forced the retirement of some 50 military officers, and sought to limit the power of state-supported religious institutions such as the Dratshang Lhentshog and Je Khenpo. On April 5, 1964, reformist Prime Minister Jigme Palden Dorji was assassinated in Phuentsholing by military cadres as the king lay ill in Switzerland. The Dorji family was subsequently put under close watch.

 The King's own uncle and head of the Royal Bhutan Army, Namgyal Bahadur, was among those executed for their role in the assassination of Jigme palden Dorji.

The post of Prime Minister (Lyonchen) was vacant, and the King identified Jigme Dorji's brother Lhendup as the successor. Lhendup's mother, then head of the Dorji family, advised the King against giving any title to Lhendup because it would have made the situation more explosive. In 1964, however, the King announced his intention to appoint Lhendup as Lyonchen. Lhendup fled to Nepal in 1965 due to political pressure, and was effectively exiled by the National Assembly.

List of prominent Dorjis
 Raja Ugyen Dorji, Gongzim (Chief Minister) 1907–1917
 Raja Sonam Topgay Dorji, Gongzim (Chief Minister) 1917–1952
 Ugyen Rimpoche, lama and son of Topgay Dorji
 Jigme Palden Dorji, Lyonchen (Prime Minister) 1952–1964
 Lhendup Dorji, Acting Lyonchen (Prime Minister) July–November 1964

See also
 Politics of Bhutan
 House of Wangchuck
 Bhutan House

References

 
Politics of Bhutan